This was the first edition of the event.

Lyudmyla Kichenok and Nadiya Kichenok won the title defeating Valentyna Ivakhnenko and Kateryna Kozlova in the final 6–2, 7–5.

Seeds

Draw

Draw

References
 Main Draw

Viccourt Cup - Doubles
Viccourt Cup
2012 in Ukrainian sport